Dino John Rossi (born October 15, 1959) is an American businessman and politician who served as a Washington State Senator thrice, from 1997 to 2003, in 2012, and again from 2016 to 2017. A Republican, he is a former Chair of the Washington State Special Olympics.

Originally from Seattle, Rossi graduated from Seattle University and later pursued a career in commercial real estate. He ran for Governor of Washington in 2004, losing to Democrat Christine Gregoire by just 129 votes in the closest gubernatorial election in the history of the United States. Four years later, in 2008, he contested the office a second time, losing to Gregoire by more than six points. He was the Republican nominee for the United States Senate in 2010, losing to incumbent Democrat Patty Murray.

Rossi returned to the Washington State Senate, being appointed in 2012 and again from 2016 to 2017. He was a candidate for the United States House of Representatives for the eighth congressional district in 2018. Rossi lost that race to Democrat Kim Schrier.

Early life, education, and early career
Rossi was the youngest of seven children brought up by his mother Eve, a beautician of Irish and Tlingit ancestry, and his father John Rossi, an Italian-American Seattle Public Schools teacher at Viewlands Elementary in North Seattle. Rossi was raised in Mountlake Terrace, graduated from Woodway High School in Edmonds, and earned a bachelor's degree in business management from Seattle University in 1982.

After college, Rossi began in the commercial real estate business, working for Melvin G. Heide at Capretto & Clark. Rossi followed Heide to two more firms as Heide was being investigated for fraud and false statements; Heide later pleaded guilty. Rossi later became a commercial real estate salesman, managing and owning real estate. Rossi was formerly an owner of the Everett Aquasox minor league baseball team. He is co-founder of the Bellevue, Washington-based Eastside Commercial Bank.

Political career

Washington State Senate  
In 1992, Rossi ran for a Washington State Senate seat in a district representing suburbs east of Seattle, in the Cascade foothills. After winning a divisive Republican Party primary, he lost the general election. In 1996, Rossi ran again for the State Senate and was elected.

Rossi served in the Washington State Senate from 1997 until December 2003, when he resigned to spend full-time running for the governorship. During his time as a senator, he gained a reputation for being a political consensus builder.

When the Senate Republicans gained the majority in 2002, Rossi became chair of the Senate Ways and Means Committee that writes the state's two year operating budget. As Ways and Means chairman, Rossi helped to carry out Democratic Governor Gary Locke's plans to close a $2.7 billion budget deficit. The budget chief for Democratic Governor Gary Locke said of Rossi in 2003, "The really good legislators move from one side to the other really effortlessly, and I think Dino did that." The Republican modifications to Locke's budget plan which Rossi oversaw included reaching a balanced budget by cutting the number of children eligible for Medicaid, cutting prenatal care for undocumented immigrants, cutting raises for state employees and increased tuition at colleges and universities. Said former governor Locke, “For years, I have simply laughed when Dino Rossi took credit for devising a no-tax-increase budget for the 2003-2005 cycle while protecting vulnerable populations."

In 1998, he co-sponsored the Mary Johnsen Act, to require ignition interlock devices for certain convicted drunk drivers in the state of Washington. He also sponsored the Dane Rempfer bill which boosted penalties for those who left the scene of a fatal accident, named after a 15-year-old boy from his district who was killed in a hit-and-run.

2004 gubernatorial campaign

Rossi decided to run in November 2003, but was already facing an uphill battle in terms of money raised, low name identification with voters and trends established by the two prior GOP candidates for governor. The sitting Washington State Attorney General and Rossi's eventual opponent in the general election, Democrat Christine Gregoire, had already raised $1.15 million by December, only weeks after Rossi officially kicked off his campaign. Furthermore, the previous two GOP candidates for governor had lost their campaign bids by 16% and 18.7% in 1996 and 2000.

In the November 2 election, over 2.8 million votes were cast for governor. After the initial vote count, Rossi led Gregoire by 261 votes.

Washington State law required a recount because of the small margin. After the second count, Rossi again led, but by a smaller margin of 42 votes. After a third count, done by hand, Gregoire took a 129-vote lead (expanded to a 133-vote lead after Justice Bridges' decision threw out 4 votes for Rossi).

King County's election department was sued by the Rossi campaign for its handling of ballots, including untracked use of a "ballot-on-demand" printing machine. Even before the election date, the U.S. Department of Justice threatened to sue Washington State for failing to mail military ballots overseas, generally assumed to be Republican votes.

Republican leaders in Washington claimed there were enough disputed votes to change the outcome of the election and sued. On May 25, 2005, the judge hearing the lawsuit ruled that the Party did not provide enough evidence that the disputed votes were ineligible, or for whom they were cast, to enable the court to overturn the election. Rossi did not appeal to the state Supreme Court.

The election is notable as the closest gubernatorial race in the history of the United States and was the subject of the Trova Heffernan book An Election for the Ages.

2004 to 2008
After the election and the ensuing court battle, Rossi returned to his work in real estate and wrote a book, Dino Rossi: Lessons in Leadership, Business, Politics and Life. Along with former Seattle Mariner baseball star Jay Buhner, he also purchased a minority share in the Seattle Mariners' single A minor league baseball team, the Everett Aquasox. Rossi also established Forward Washington Foundation, a 501(c)(4) non-profit lobbying entity dedicated to promoting changes to Washington's small business climate.

In 2007, the Washington State Democratic Party filed a complaint with the Washington Public Disclosure Committee (PDC) asserting that the Forward Washington Foundation was too similar to a campaign to be exempt from campaign finance laws. Prior to her party's formal complaint, Gregoire stated to donors that she was "campaigning aggressively". The PDC dismissed in totality the allegations made by the Washington State Democrats, deeming each accusatory claim as "insufficient" and stating that the organization was indeed acting consistent with its mission statement, making it "a social welfare organization (...) and not a political committee".

2008 gubernatorial campaign

On October 25, 2007, Dino Rossi announced his intention to seek the office of Governor of Washington in 2008. Rossi's campaign was centered on many of the same issues he ran under in the 2004 election, namely controlling the spending of the state's legislature, tax cuts, and improving the business environment within the state. He was endorsed by The Seattle Times.

On October 7, a lawsuit was filed against the Building Industry Association of Washington (BIAW), for allegedly coordinating fundraising activities with Rossi in violation of Washington's public finance laws. Rossi's campaign spokeswoman dismissed the suit as a desperate attempt by Gregoire's supporters to win an election through frivolous legal maneuvering, a claim that was denied by the lawyer that filed the suit. In 2010 the lawsuit was dismissed "with prejudice".

Dino Rossi was defeated by Governor Christine Gregoire in the 2008 election and formally conceded at noon on November 5, 2008. Her margin of victory was 53.2% to 46.8%.

2008 to 2010
Following his defeat in the 2008 gubernatorial election, Rossi "unplugged from almost everything political" and became a principal at Coast Equity Partners, a commercial real estate firm in Everett, Washington. Rossi's role at the firm was to find investors for income producing properties in Washington and four other Western U.S. states.

2010 U.S. Senate campaign 

In early 2010, Washington State Republicans began courting various conservatives to challenge incumbent Senator Patty Murray in a year that was seen by many as a vulnerable year for Democratic candidates. On May 26, 2010, Dino Rossi officially announced his candidacy for the U.S. Senate. In the blanket primary, Rossi defeated Tea Party favorite Clint Didier 34% to 12%. Rossi went on to lose the general Election on November 4, after two days' worth of ballot counting indicated that he would not have enough votes to defeat Sen. Murray. In the final tally Murray received 1,314,930 votes (52.1%) to Rossi's 1,196,164 (47.4%).

The National Rifle Association spent $414,100 supporting Rossi and opposing Murray in the 2010 senatorial contest.

2012 and 2016 appointments to the State Senate 

On July 10, 2012, Rossi was appointed to fill the term of Senator Cheryl Pflug. Rossi left office in November 2012, when Mark Mullet was sworn in.

After 2012 redistricting and the 2016 death of State Senator Andy Hill, Dino Rossi was appointed to the 45th District State Senate Seat. The Republican Party chose him over Kirkland City Councilman Toby Nixon and Joel Hussey from the King County Council. Democrat Manka Dhingra defeated Republican Jinyoung Englund to take the seat in the November 7, 2017 special election.

2018 U.S. House campaign 

On September 19, 2017, Rossi announced that he would run for the U.S. House of Representatives in the 8th Congressional District. The seat was held by Dave Reichert, who had decided not to run for reelection. Rossi advanced out of the top-two primary to face Democrat Kim Schrier in the general election, which he lost, getting 48%.

Personal life
Rossi is married, with four children, and lives in Sammamish, Washington. He identifies as a faithful Catholic.

Electoral history

Notes

References

External links
Dino Rossi for Congress
Washington State Senate Republican Caucus website
Campaign contributions at OpenSecrets.org

|-

|-

|-

1959 births
21st-century American politicians
American people of Irish descent
American people of Italian descent
Candidates in the 2004 United States elections
Candidates in the 2008 United States elections
Candidates in the 2010 United States elections
Living people
Native American state legislators in Washington (state)
People from Sammamish, Washington
Businesspeople from Seattle
Politicians from Seattle
Seattle University alumni
Tlingit people
Republican Party Washington (state) state senators
People from Mountlake Terrace, Washington
Candidates in the 2018 United States elections